Alluaudiopsis is a genus of shrubby flowering plants belonging to the family Didiereaceae. Species of Alluaudiopsis are dioecious, with male and female flowers on separate plants.

Its native range is Southern Madagascar.

Species:

Alluaudiopsis fiherenensis 
Alluaudiopsis marnieriana

References

Didiereaceae
Caryophyllales genera
Dioecious plants